Sergeyevo is a rural locality (a village) in Kurilovskoye Rural Settlement, Sobinsky District, Vladimir Oblast, Russia. The population was 4 in 2010.

Geography 
Sergeyevo is located on the Vorsha River, 14 km northwest of Sobinka (the district's administrative centre) by road. Rybkhoz Vorsha is the nearest rural locality.

References 

Rural localities in Sobinsky District